Blow is the surname of several people, including:
Charles M. Blow, (born 1970), an American journalist and columnist for The New York Times.
David Mervyn Blow (1931-2004), an influential British biophysicist
Detmar Blow (1867-1939), a British architect of the early 20th century
Godfrey Blow (born 1948), an artist based in Kalamunda, Western Australia
Henry Taylor Blow (1817-1876), a U.S. Representative and Ambassador from Missouri
Isabella Blow (1958–2007), a British magazine editor and international style icon
John Blow (1649-1708), an English composer and organist
Jonathan Blow (born 1971), a video game programmer and designer
Kurtis Blow (born 1951), an American rapper
Sandra Blow (1925-2006), an English painter
Susan Blow (1843-1916), an American educator
Thomas Blow (1862-1932), a provincial level politician from Alberta, Canada

See also
 Blew (surname)